Phymorhynchus ovatus is a species of sea snail, a marine gastropod mollusk in the family Raphitomidae.

Description
The length of the shell attains 67 mm.

Distribution
This species was found at the Logatchev site, Mid-Atlantic Ridge at a depth of 3,000 m.

References

External links
 Warén A. & Bouchet P. (2001). Gastropoda and Monoplacophora from hydrothermal vents and seeps new taxa and records. The Veliger, 44(2): 116-231
 

ovatus
Gastropods described in 2001